Silver Glacier is in North Cascades National Park in the U.S. state of Washington and descends to the northwest from near the summit of Mount Spickard. In 1993, Silver Glacier had an area of .49 km2. The National Park Service is currently studying Silver Glacier as part of their glacier monitoring project. Between 1993 (when monitoring began) and 2013 the glacier had lost ~8 m of thickness.

See also
List of glaciers in the United States

References

Glaciers of the North Cascades
Cirques of the United States
Glaciers of Whatcom County, Washington
Glaciers of Washington (state)